Dogie Butte is a summit in Harding County, South Dakota, in the United States.

References

Landforms of Harding County, South Dakota
Mountains of South Dakota